KTLQ 1350 AM is a radio station licensed to Tahlequah, Oklahoma.  The station broadcasts a classic country format and is owned by Payne 5 Communications, LLC.

Translators

References

External links
KTLQ's website

TLQ
Classic country radio stations in the United States